The men's football tournament at the 1998 Asian Games was held from 30 November to 19 December 1998 in Thailand.

Venues

Squads

Results
All times are Indochina Time (UTC+07:00)

Preliminary round

Group A

Group B

Group C

Group D

Group E

Group F

Group G

Group H

Second round

Group 1

Group 2

Group 3

Group 4

Knockout round

Quarterfinals

Semifinals

Bronze medal match

Gold medal match

Goalscorers

Final standing

References

RSSSF

External links
Results
Asian Football Results 1998

Men